The Asia Pacific Film Institute is a film school in the Philippines.

It is the first independently run and self-supporting film school in the country. It offers full educational services and training facilities in  classic and modern film making with neither funding nor alliance from any college, university, agency or film association.

Accreditation
The institute is accredited as a technical and vocational postsecondary institution by the Technical Education and Skills Development Authority (TESDA) of the Philippines.

Programs
The film school offers comprehensive filmmaking programs and short training courses in allied fields.

1 Year Diploma Program Motion Picture Production

First Term:
1)	Directing 101
2)	Scriptwriting 101
3)	Cinematography 101
4)	Production Design
5)	Production Management
6)      Editing 101

Second Term:
1)	Directing 201
2)	Scriptwriting 201
3)	Cinematography 201
4)	EDITING 201

Third Term:
1)	Thesis - Individual a 15–20 minutes short film
-	35mm or HD Camera
2)	Visual Effects
3)      Sound

WORKSHOPS are under UFO WORKSHOPS for people who don't have time for a One year comprehensive Film making Program.

Faculty
The institute draws its faculty from experienced professionals in the film industry.

Celso Ad Castillo - Resident Director, Directing/Scriptwriting
Reginald Vinluan - Visual Effects
Manny Morfe - Professor, Production Design
Boy Vinarao - Professor, Directing/Editing(Linear)
Robert Quebral - Professor, Cinematography 35mm
Nap Jamir - Professor, Cinematography
Jade Castro - Professor, Scriptwriting/Directing
Raymond Lee - ScriptWriting
Emman Dela Cruz - Directing
Edber Mamisao - Directing
JD Domingo  - Editing
Mads Adrias - Production Management

References

External links
Asia Pacific Film Institute
Technical and Education Skills Authority of the Philippines

Film schools in the Philippines
Vocational education in the Philippines
Schools in Mandaluyong